QCM may refer to:

Quality Capital Management, a UK-based hedge fund specialising in managed futures.
Quartz crystal microbalance, a weighing instrument which measures a mass per unit area by measuring the change in frequency of a quartz crystal resonator
Quad City Mallards, a former ECHL team that played in the Quad Cities area of Illinois
Quality Control Music, an American record label